Ernst Ulrich von Weizsäcker (born 25 June 1939) is a German scientist and politician (SPD). He was a member of the German Bundestag and  served as co-president of the Club of Rome jointly with Anders Wijkman 2011 – 2019.

Family
A member of the prominent Weizsäcker family, he is the son of physicist and philosopher Carl Friedrich von Weizsäcker and nephew of former German president Richard von Weizsäcker. Since 1969, he is married to Christine von Weizsäcker. Together, they have five children, including MEP Jakob von Weizsäcker.

Youth and education
Born in Zürich, Switzerland, Weizsäcker spent his childhood in Zürich and Göttingen. In 1966, he graduated from Hamburg University with a Diplom in physics. In 1968, he obtained his PhD in biology from Freiburg University.

Career
In 1972, he was appointed full professor of biology at Essen University. In 1975, he was recruited as president of the then newly founded University of Kassel. In 1981, he joined the United Nations in New York as director at the UN Center for Science and Technology. From 1984 to 1991 he headed the Institute for European Environmental Policy in Bonn. In 1991, Weizsäcker became founding president of the Wuppertal Institute, soon establishing itself as a leading environmental think tank.

In 1998, he was elected a member of the German Bundestag for the Social Democratic Party (SPD) and re-elected in 2002. As a legislator, he chaired the select committee on globalization (2000–2002) and the environment committee (2002–2005). After his decision not to run in the 2005 election, he became Dean of the Bren School of Environmental Science & Management at the University of California, Santa Barbara. He returned to Germany in 2009 where is his an honorary professor at Freiburg University.

A bestselling author in Germany, his English language books include Earth Politics (1994), Factor Four: Doubling Wealth, Halving Resource Use (1995), Factor 5 (2009)  and Limits to Privatization (2005).

Awards and honours
 2000 Honorary doctorate of Sōka University
 2001 Takeda Award
 2008 German Environmental Prize
 2009 Commander's Cross of the Order of Merit of the Federal Republic of Germany
 2011 Theodor Heuss Prize
 2012 Order of Merit of Baden-Württemberg
Honorary Councillor of the World Future Council

References

External links

 Website of Ernst Ulrich von Weizsäcker

1939 births
Living people
Members of the Bundestag for Baden-Württemberg
Members of the Bundestag 2002–2005
Members of the Bundestag 1998–2002
Politicians from Zürich
Ernst Ulrich
Club of Rome members
Members of the European Academy of Sciences and Arts
Non-fiction environmental writers
Commanders Crosses of the Order of Merit of the Federal Republic of Germany
Recipients of the Order of Merit of Baden-Württemberg
Members of the Bundestag for the Social Democratic Party of Germany
Scientists from Zürich